Dark Thrones and Black Flags  is the 13th studio album by the Norwegian band Darkthrone. It was released 20 October 2008 by Peaceville Records. The music largely followed in the style of their previous album, F.O.A.D. Half of the lyrics and music were written by Nocturno Culto, while the other half were written by Fenriz.

Track listing

All songs published by Vile Music/Imagem Music.

Personnel
Fenriz – vocals, lead and rhythm guitars, drums
Nocturno Culto – vocals, lead and rhythm guitars, bass

Production
Recorded, "hardly" produced, engineered and mixed by Nocturno Culto

2008 albums
Darkthrone albums
Peaceville Records albums